Street Child is a debut album by Mexican alternative rock vocalist, Elan. It contains her biggest hit, Midnight.

Ricardo Burgos from Sony Music called Street Child "a history making release in Latin America".

Track listing

Re-edition track listing
 Leave Me (3:52)
 Midnight (4:33)
 Sorry Baby (4:23)
 Hideaway (5:18)
 Jeremy (3:49)
 The Road (4:53)
 They Came From the City (3:39)
 Shy (4:05)
 So Happy (9:04)
 Call Home (4:30)
 Time (4:27)
 Street Child  (10:08 – features Slash (musician) - contains a hidden track)
 Perfect Life (hidden track) (3:36)

International Edition track listing
 Leave Me (3:53)
 Midnight (4:33)
 Sorry Baby (4:22)
 Hideaway (5:18)
 Jeremy (3:49)
 The Road (4:53)
 They Came From the City (3:39)
 Shy (4:05)
 Another Woman (3:58)
 Call Home (4:30)
 Time (4:27)
 Street Child (10:08 - contains a hidden track)
 Perfect Life (hidden track) (3:35)

Singles
 Midnight
 They Came From the City
 Hideaway
 Street Child
 Time

References

2003 albums
Elán (musician) albums